Candice Susan Swanepoel (born 20 October 1988) is a South African model and philanthropist. She is known for her work with Victoria's Secret. She became a Victoria's Secret Angel in 2010. In 2016, she was listed 8th on the Forbes top-earning models list.

Early life
Swanepoel was born to Willem Swanepoel and Eileen Swanepoel (née Green) and raised in Mooi River, South Africa. Swanepoel comes from an Afrikaner family of Dutch origin. Her father is from Mutare, Zimbabwe, while her mother is South African.  She has one older brother named Stephen. While growing up, Swanepoel was a ballet dancer. She attended boarding school at St. Anne's Diocesan College in the nearby town of Hilton. At age 15, she was spotted by a model scout in a Durban flea market.

Career
Swanepoel has appeared in editorials in American, Italian, British, Spanish, German, Greek, Russian, Australian, Brazilian, Japanese, Korean, Chinese, and Mexican Vogue; Brazilian, British, German and South African Elle; British, South African, Romanian, Mexican and Chinese GQ; American, Spanish, Czech, Argentine, Turkish and Korean Harper's Bazaar; V, Allure, W, and i-D.

Swanepoel has walked the runway for Fendi, Chanel, Tommy Hilfiger, Dolce and Gabbana, Michael Kors, Donna Karan, Giambattista Valli, Jason Wu, Prabal Gurung, Rag & Bone, Oscar de la Renta, Elie Saab, Diane von Fürstenberg, Sportmax, Betsey Johnson, Stella McCartney, Viktor and Rolf, Givenchy, Off-White, Versace, Jean Paul Gaultier, Christian Dior, Blumarine, Etro and Ralph Lauren.

She has appeared in advertising campaigns for Tom Ford, Oscar De La Renta, Givenchy, Chanel, Miu Miu, Tommy Hilfiger, Rag & Bone, Ralph Lauren, Shiatzy Chen, Michael Kors, Blumarine, Versace, Prabal Gurung, Diesel, Guess?, Off-White, Swarovski, Agua Bendita, Colcci, True Religion, Nike, Juicy Couture, as well as for Victoria's Secret since 2007. In addition to appearing in the lingerie brand's commercials, she was a featured model in the 2010 "SWIM" catalog, along with Lindsay Ellingson, Rosie Huntington-Whiteley, Behati Prinsloo, and Erin Heatherton.

In 2010, Swanepoel became a Victoria's Secret Angel. Swanepoel modeled for the Kardashians' 2010 swimwear line. On 12 August 2010, Swanepoel officially opened the first Victoria's Secret retail store in Canada, at West Edmonton Mall, Edmonton. In 2013, Swanepoel was named the cover model of the coveted Victoria's Secret Swim Catalogue. Swanepoel was chosen to wear the "Fantasy Bra" in the 2013 Victoria's Secret Fashion Show. The 10 million dollar bra, named the "Royal Fantasy Bra", was created by Mouawad. The bra and its matching belt featured over 4,200 precious gems, including rubies, diamonds and yellow sapphires set in 18 carat gold with a 52-carat ruby at the center.

In 2018, she launched her own swimwear collection Tropic of C.
She won Launch of the Year award at the 5th Annual Daily Front Row Awards.

Popularity
Swanepoel was voted No. 61 in 2010, No. 62 in 2011, No. 75 in 2013, and No. 36 in 2015 in FHMs annual "100 Sexiest Women in the World" poll and No. 1 in 2014 Maxims "Hot 100 List".
In 2019, she was honored with Revolve's Woman of the Year award.

Wealth
Swanepoel made her debut at No. 10 on Forbes "The World's Top-Earning Models" list, with estimated earnings of $3 million between 2010 and 2011. She was ranked No. 9 in 2013 with estimated earnings of $3.3 million. In 2015, she was ranked No 8 with earnings of $5 million. In 2016, she was ranked No 8 with earnings of $7 million.

Personal life
Swanepoel is fluent in Afrikaans, English, and Portuguese, the latter of which she learned from her now ex-boyfriend Hermann Nicoli, a Brazilian model. They began dating after they met in Paris when she was 17 and he was 23. In August 2015, the couple announced their engagement. They have two sons together. The couple acrimoniously split in November 2018, but are still active co-parents to their two sons.

, she reportedly splits her time between Brazil and New York City.

Charity
Swanepoel is actively involved in mothers2mothers, a charity devoted to achieving an "HIV-free generation" of children and mothers in Africa. Swanepoel has designed denims for it, and in May 2019, joined the charity as a patron and their global ambassador.

References

External links

 
 
 
 

1988 births
Afrikaner people
Elite Model Management models
Living people
People from Mpofana Local Municipality
South African expatriates in the United States
South African female models
South African people of Zimbabwean descent
The Lions (agency) models
Victoria's Secret Angels